Federation of Bangladesh Chambers of Commerce and Industry (FBCCI) is the apex trade organization of Bangladesh playing a pivotal role in consultative and advisory capacity, safeguarding the interest of the private sector in the country.

History 
The Federation of Bangladesh Chambers of Commerce and Industry was established in 1973 under the Trade Organization Ordinance and Companies Act, 1913.

Objectives and functions 
 To coordinate and promote the interest of its federating units-Chambers of Commerce, Trade and Industrial Association
 To aid and stimulate investment, development of trade, commerce, industry, agriculture, tourism, human resources and communication sectors in Bangladesh
 To project, encourage and safeguard the cause of the private sector through effective participation in the process of consultation and inter-action with the Government, Ministerial Consultative Committees and other inter-ministerial bodies and agencies
 To assist the Chambers of Commerce and Industry and Associations in organizing of Trade and Industry Fairs in different parts of Bangladesh
 To collect and disseminate statistical and other information for advancement of trade and industry
 To make efforts for the spread of commercial, technical and economic knowledge for promotion of commercial, technical, industrial and scientific education in the country
 To study and undertake research for promotion and growth of trade and industry
 FBCCI is involved in forging strong bilateral ties between and among different countries of the world through counterpart organizations for commercial and economic cooperation. It helps promote Foreign Direct Investment (FDI) including Joint Ventures in Bangladesh and identify appropriate partners
 It maintains close relation with Overseas National Chambers of Commerce and other Trade and Industrial Associations including related economic organization
 The FBCCI as the Apex Trade Organization plays the pivotal role in consultative and advisory capacity in formulation of Commercial, Industrial and Fiscal policies at the national level. It has been playing a very vital role in all Forum of the Government and Economic Development organizations for mutual sharing of views on all vital issues concerning and affecting the national economy
 FBCCI represents the Private Sector in different permanent committees of the Government and autonomous bodies
 FBCCI also represents the Private Sector in various Committees and Task Forces on specific issues, constituted by the Government from time to time.

Structure

Board of Directors
President - 01 (Currently Md. Jashim Uddin)
Senior Vice-President - 01 (Currently Mostofa Azad Chowdhury Babu)
Vice-Presidents - 06 (Currently: M.A Momen, Md. Aminul Hoque Shamim, Md. Amin Helaly, Salahuddin Alamgir, Md. Habib Ullah Dawn and M. A Razzak Khan)
Directors - 46

Division of work
General Affairs Division 
Membership & Legal Affairs Division 
International Division
Research Division
Trade & Finance Division
PR & Protocols Division
SME & Price Monitoring Division

Member bodies
Chambers of Commerce and Industry
A Class Chamber - 60
B Class Chamber - 19
Trade and Industrial Association
A Class Association - 372
B Class Association - 05
 Joint Chamber (with Foreign Countries) - 20

Members
Members of the FBCCI are District Chambers, Regional Chambers, Associations,  bilateral and national industry associations.

International Links 
International Linkages FBCCI maintains close relations with Trade and Industrial Associations and other mercantile and public bodies abroad. FBCCI is the member of different international bodies, such as International Chamber of Commerce (ICC), Islamic Chamber of Commerce and Industry (ICCI), Confederation of Asia-Pacific Chambers of Commerce and Industry (CACCI), and the SAARC Chamber of Commerce and Industry (SAARC CCI). FBCCI also interacts with various international economic and trade promotion organizations including UNDP, ESCAP, UNIDO, ITC, GATT-UNCTAD. To safeguard and protect the interest of business community in the international arena, FBCCI maintains close communication with these International Organizations. Presently FBCCI is the chair of the BCIM (Bangladesh-China-India-Myanmar) Business Council.

The Federation of FBCCI has Joint Chambers/Co-operation Agreement with the national trade organizations of a good number of countries including Australia, Belarus, Belgium, Bhutan, Brazil, Cambodia, Canada, China, Czech Republic, Finland, France, Germany, Georgia, Hong Kong, India, Indonesia, Iran, Italy, Japan, Republic of Korea, Kuwait, Malaysia, Morocco, Myanmar, Nepal, Netherlands, Oman, Pakistan, Peru, Philippine, Qatar, Romania, Russian Federation, Saudi Arabia, Singapore, South Africa, Sri Lanka, Syria, Taiwan, Thailand, Turkey, UAE, Uganda, Ukraine, USA, Uzbekistan & Vietnam.

See also
 Chittagong Chamber of Commerce & Industry
 Dhaka Chamber of Commerce & Industry

References

External links
 Official website of FBCCI

Chambers of commerce in Bangladesh
1973 establishments in Bangladesh
Organisations based in Dhaka